Holy Island or Holy Isle may refer to:

Places

United Kingdom

England
 Holy Island, also known as Lindisfarne, Northumberland, home of a medieval monastery
Beal for Holy Island railway station, closed railway station 
Holy Island Sill, part of the geological structure of the island
Holy Island War Memorial
Holy Island Waggonway

Scotland
 Eileach an Naoimh, also known as Holy Isle, located in the Firth of Lorn
 Holy Island, Firth of Clyde, off the Isle of Arran

Wales
 Holy Island, Anglesey

Ireland
 Inis Cealtra, near Mountshannon on the west shore of Lough Derg

Russia
 Vaygach Island, Arctic Circle, with one community of 100 inhabitants, Varnek, Russia

United States
 Holy Island, Massachusetts
 Holy Island (Lake Charlevoix), Michigan

Other uses
 The Holy Island, a 1959 Bengali film
Holy Island, 2015 novel by LJ Ross